Cantharellus coccolobae  is a species of Cantharellus from Caribbean, the Bahamas, and Florida, United States.

References

External links
 
 

coccolobae
Fungi described in 2016